G. B. Jones (born 1965) is a Canadian artist, filmmaker, musician, and publisher of zines born in Bowmanville, Canada. She is known for producing J.D.s with her acclaimedTom Girls drawings before going on to create more musically, cinematically, and artistically. Additionally, her diverse projects have amply contributed to the LGBTQ+ space. Queerness is intersected with her variety of mediums and is done so purposefully with the hopes of sparking more societal discussion, connecting with more readers/ and viewers, or just being her authentic self in all she engages in. Jones continues to live and work in Toronto, Canada.

Career

Music
Jones' musical career began when she was a young child, singing Canadian folk songs in the school choir. Though she didn’t have enough money to buy records, her uncle was very involved in the folk music community and exposed her to a musical education that would prove valuable later on. From the early 1980s to the late 1990s, Jones performed with the all woman post-punk band Fifth Column, playing drums, guitar and background vocals, and was one of the co-founders of the group. The band's first album, To Sir With Hate was released in 1985. In 2002, Fifth Column's last release, Imbecile, appeared on the Kill Rock Stars compilation album Fields and Streams.

Artwork and publications
G. B. Jones initially received recognition for her Tom Girls drawings, which were published in the queer punk fanzine J.D.s, founded by Jones and co-published with Bruce LaBruce. It would go on to include contributors like Anonymous Boy and Dennis Cooper. J.D.s was modeled after a soft- core gay magazine from the 50s and early 60s called Physique Pictorial in an effort to not only elevate queer history, but also to critique it, expand it, and bring it up to date. Before there was J.D.s, Jones found her footing with Photocopy Art and the photocopier through the help of her instructor, Barbara Astman. The empire Jones and LaBruce formed, in addition to the zine produced, included creating compilation cassettes like HIDE with Caroline Azar, directing and starring in videos, hosting a film series at a Toronto nightclub, and heading a clique of anarchists called the New Lavender Panthers.

Themes 
In an interview with Xtra Toronto, Jones shares, “I was interested in certain issues that I don’t think many people may have picked up on in the work, ideas about authority figures, power, obviously, and the abuse of power, and gender roles as they pertain to both sexes. I think there’s been a tendency to take a very reductivist view of the work as simply erotic and kind of dismiss that there could be any other concerns involved.”

According to Dodie Bellamy, G. B. Jones "co-opts the male-on-male objectifying gaze of gay erotica and converts it to a female-on-female gaze" and herTom Girls series of drawings (based on the work of Tom of Finland) are "unapologetic, thrillingly anti-assimilationist." Jones gives her marginalized female characters a place to reclaim their power. By changing the narrative, Jones's drawings allow viewers to compare the effect of women in those positions of authority versus the men.

Legacy 
J.D.s would go on to inspire future queercore zines like S.C.A.B (Society for the Annihilation of Breeders) and Fanorama. Fifth Column would qo on to pave the path for queercore, riot grrl scenes, and entire movements such as Queercore Punk and Vaginal Davis.

On Queerness 
Jones coined the term “homocore” with LaBruce to cater to the social mutants of the underground. It later evolved into "queercore" to be more inclusive.

Exhibition history
Jones has exhibited her art nationally and internationally since the early 1990s, in spaces such as Columbus Museum of Art, Columbus; Participant Inc., New York; Mercer Union, Toronto; The Power Plant, Toronto; Kunsthalle Exnergasse, Vienna; White Columns, New York; AKA Artist Run Space, Winnipeg; Muncher Kunstverein, Munich; and Schwules Museum, Berlin. Her first gallery was Feature Inc. in New York, curated by Hudson, who was the first art dealer to showcase her Tom Girls series of drawings from 1991 to 1999.

Selected solo exhibitions 

 G.B. Jones, Cooper Cole, Toronto, Canada (2022)
 Temple of Friendship, Cooper Cole, Toronto, Canada (2020)
 what’s next is close at hand, Cooper Cole, Toronto, Canada (2018)
 Born Yesterday (two-person with Paul P.), Participant Inc, New York, USA (2017)
 Past Present Future, Lexander, Los Angeles, USA (2011)
 La-bas, La Centrale Galerie, Montreal, Canada (2008)
 Rise Up Thou Earth, Sunday, New York, USA (2007)
 The Power and the Glory, Paul Petro Contemporary Art, Toronto, Canada (2005)
 Crush, Paul Petro Contemporary Art, Toronto, Canada (2003)
 Good. Bad. G.B. Jones (cur. Reid Shier), Or Gallery, Vancouver, Canada (1996)
 Girly Pictures (cur. Shonagh Adelman), Mercer Union, Toronto, Canada (1994)
 Feature, New York, USA (1991)

Filmography
Jones has been making movies since 1985 and her work has been exhibited throughout North America, South America, Europe, Israel and Australia. Her most recent movie, "The Lollipop Generation", was showcased at the Gala Premiere for The Images Festival of 2008 and from there went on to play around the world. Jones would create her movies on Super 8 mm film and analogue video, utilizing guerrilla film tactics and embracing a no-budget credo she refers to as "The Aesthetics of Poverty." As a result, G.B. has frequently been regarded as the creator and contributor for important cultural movements which have emerged in the past three decades.

Director
 The Troublemakers, directed by G. B. Jones (1990)
 The Yo-Yo Gang, directed by G. B. Jones (1992)
 The Lollipop Generation, directed by G. B. Jones (2008)
 The Dark End of the Street, directed by G.B. Jones (2017)

Actor
 Fifth Column at the Funnel, directed by John Porter (1982)
 Boy, Girl, directed by Bruce LaBruce (1987)
 Bruce and Pepper Wayne Gacy's Home Movies, directed by Bruce LaBruce and Candy Parker (1988)
 Like This, music video for Fifth Column, directed by Bruce LaBruce and Fifth Column (1990)
 No Skin Off My Ass, directed by Bruce LaBruce (1991)
 Donna, music video for Fifth Column, directed by Friday Myers (1994)
 She's Real, directed by Lucy Thane (1997)
 I Believe in the Good Of Life, music video for The Hidden Cameras, directed by Joel Gibb, (2005)
 She Said Boom: The Story of Fifth Column, directed by Kevin Hegge, (2012)
 Queercore: How to Punk a Revolution, directed by Yony Leyser, (2017]

Further reading
 "G. B. Jones: Living Life Like a Car Crash", Lexander Magazine (28 March 2013)

 Books
 Jennifer Camper, ed., Juicy Mother, Soft Skull Press, 2005, 
 Jennifer Camper and Manic D Press, eds., Juicy Mother 2: How They Met,  2007 
 Firoza Elavia, ed., Cinematic folds: the furling and unfurling of images,  Pleasure Dome, 2008, 
 Marcus Ewert and Mitchell Watkins, eds., Ruh Roh, published by Feature Inc. and Instituting Contemporary Idea, NYC, 1992
 Robin Fisher, ed., 'What's Wrong? Explicit Graphic Interpretations Against Censorship, Arsenal Pulp Press, 2002, 
 Andrea Juno, ed., Dangerous Drawings, Juno Books, 1997, 
 Selene Kapsaski (edited by Jeremy Richey),  Welcome to Jonestown: Southern Ontario Gothic, Art Decades, 2015, 
 Robert Kirby  and David Kelly,  eds., Boy Trouble, Boy Trouble Books, 2004, 
 Robert Kirby and David Kelly, eds., The Book of Boy Trouble 2: Born to Trouble,  Green Candy Press, 2008 
 Andy Paciorek and Katherine Beem, eds, Folk Horror Revival: Field Studies,  Wyrd Harvest Press, 2015, 
 Leila Pourtavaf, ed., Feminismes Electrique. La Centrale, 2012, 
 Spencer, Amy; DIY: The Rise Of Lo-Fi, Marion Boyars Publishers, London, England, 2005 
 Scott Treleaven, The Salivation Army Black Book , Printed Matter Inc./Art Metropole, 2006, 

 G. B. Jones, editor

 Double Bill, edited by Caroline Azar, Jena von Brücker, G. B. Jones, Johnny Noxzema, Rex, Issues 1–5, 1991 to 2001
 J.D.s, edited by Bruce LaBruce and G. B. Jones, Issues 1-7, 1985 to 1991
 Hide, edited by Caroline Azar, Candy Pauker, G. B. Jones, Issues 1-5, 1981 to 1985

See also
 J.D.s List of female film and television directors
 List of LGBT-related films directed by women

References

External links
 G. B. Jones on YouTube
 
 Bunny & the Lakers at WFMU'' (February 15, 2010)

Living people
Canadian contemporary artists
Canadian experimental filmmakers
Canadian women drummers
Canadian women guitarists
Canadian film actresses
Canadian punk rock drummers
Canadian punk rock guitarists
Canadian women artists
Canadian women film directors
Canadian LGBT artists
LGBT film directors
Pop artists
Queercore musicians
Women experimental filmmakers
Actresses from Toronto
Artists from Toronto
Film directors from Toronto
Musicians from Toronto
Fifth Column (band) members
Riot grrrl musicians
Feminist musicians
1965 births
Canadian lesbian musicians